Monte Romo is a district of the Hojancha canton, in the Guanacaste province of Costa Rica.

History 
Monte Romo was created on 23 July 1999 by Decreto Ejecutivo 28027-G. Segregated from Hojancha.

Geography 
Monte Romo has an area of  km² and an elevation of  metres.

Villages
Administrative center of the district is the village of Monte Romo.

Other villages in the district are Altos del Socorro, Bajo Saltos, Cabrera, Cuesta Roja, Delicias, Guapinol, Loros, Mercedes, Palmares, Río Zapotal, San Isidro and Trinidad.

Demographics 

For the 2011 census, Monte Romo had a population of  inhabitants.

Transportation

Road transportation 
The district is covered by the following road routes:
 National Route 902

References 

Districts of Guanacaste Province
Populated places in Guanacaste Province